The MacKay School for the Deaf is a provincial school in Montreal, Quebec, Canada with day programs serving deaf and hard-of-hearing students.

The school teaches elementary.

Deaf student population approximately 30 in the elementary school.

Deaf students from Canada often attend Gallaudet University in Washington D.C. for post secondary programs.

References

Schools for the deaf in Canada
Special schools in Canada
Educational institutions established in 1964
1964 establishments in Quebec